Logan Lynn is the second studio album released by Logan Lynn on his own label, Logan Lynn Music, on September 20, 2006.

Music videos
Official music videos were released for all three singles over the course of 2006.  The "Ring Around" video was directed by Dani Hunter and featured a drugged-out Lynn sketching out all over Portland.  The director of photography was Galvin Collins.  The editor/cameraman was Chris Davis, with makeup by Patty Kovach.  The "Come Home" video was directed by Rebecca Micciche and featured Lynn in his NW Portland condo alongside actors cast in the role of his family members.  This video also featured costuming by Emmy Award-winning stylist/designer Amanda Needham (Portlandia).

Track listing

References

2006 albums
Logan Lynn albums